The canton of La Tour-du-Pin is an administrative division of the Isère department, eastern France. Its borders were modified at the French canton reorganisation which came into effect in March 2015. Its seat is in La Tour-du-Pin.

It consists of the following communes:
 
La Bâtie-Montgascon
Cessieu
La Chapelle-de-la-Tour
Dolomieu
Faverges-de-la-Tour
Montagnieu
Montcarra
Le Passage
Rochetoirin
Saint-André-le-Gaz
Saint-Clair-de-la-Tour
Saint-Didier-de-la-Tour
Sainte-Blandine
Saint-Jean-de-Soudain
Saint-Victor-de-Cessieu
Torchefelon
La Tour-du-Pin

References

Cantons of Isère